Svědomí is a Czech drama film. It was released in 1948.

External links
 

1940s Czech-language films
1948 films
Czechoslovak drama films
1948 drama films
Czechoslovak black-and-white films
1940s Czech films